Desh Dekhi Bidesh (Nepali:देश देखि बीदेश), shortened as DDB is a movie made in Nepal which was released in 2008. It was directed by Narendra Thapa, with a script by Subash Singh Basnet and starring Nikhil Upreti and Prerana Sharma in the lead roles, and with Dilip Rayamajhi, Richa Ghimire, Daman Rupakheti, Anju Lama, Nirajan Sigdel, and others.  In addition to being shot in Nepal, many parts of the film were shot in other countries.

Plot
This Nepali movie is about the All people who live in Nepal – who were forced to leave home to work on foreign soil or in a different region, like Deepak (Nikhil Upreti) in this movie who has to leave his country for a job to make money to live.

Cast
Nikhil Upreti as Deepak
Dilip Rayamajhi as
Richa Ghimire as Pooja
Prerana Sharma as Rita
Daman Rupakheti as Jhamke
Gopal Dhakal

Music
The music of Desh Dekhi Bidesh was released in  2008. The album features music by composer Sambhujeet Baskota.

Tracks
The album consists of the following eight tracks:

References

External links 
 

2008 films
2000s Nepali-language films
Nepalese romantic drama films